The 2006/07 FIS Nordic Combined World Cup was the 23rd world cup season, a combination of ski jumping and cross-country skiing organized by FIS. It started on 25 Nov 2005 in Kuusamo, Finland and ended on 19 March 2006 in Sapporo, Japan.

Calendar

Men 

*=Trondheim was cancelled and replaced with Lillehammer

Standings

Overall 

Standings after 21 events.

Sprint 

Standings after 10 events.

Warsteiner Grand Prix 

Standings after 3 events.

Nations Cup 

Standings after 21 events.

References

External links
FIS Nordic Combined World Cup 2005/06 

2005 in Nordic combined
2006 in Nordic combined
FIS Nordic Combined World Cup